Godawari River are two different rivers (tributaries), located in two different regions of Nepal.

Godawari Khola (Bagmati)
Godawari Khola is a tributary of Bagmati river of Nepal. It is a sacred river for Hindus. Every twelve years, Pushkaram fair is held on its banks of the river. Godawari, Lalitpur (municipality) is named after this river. total area of naudhara= 0.011km^2

Godawari Khola (Sudurpashchim)
Godawari river in Sudurpashchim is also a tributary of Ghaghra river. It is also understood a sacred river of Nepal. Godawari, Sudurpashchim (Capital of Sudurpashchim Province) was named after this river. Godawari Makar Mela (fair) held on the river of Godawari in Godawari Municipality.

References

Rivers of Bagmati Province
Bagmati Province
Sudurpashchim Province
Rivers of Sudurpashchim Province